Nationality words link to articles with information on the nation's poetry or literature (for instance, Irish or France).

Events
 Pope Paul III issues the Index Librorum Prohibitorum, a list of books forbidden to Catholics (the first official index is started in 1564).
 Pierre de Ronsard is tonsured in Le Mans, where he met Jacques Peletier.

Works published
 Juan Boscan and Garcilaso de la Vega, published posthumously, Spain
 John Hardyng, Chronicle, contains a version of the quest for the Holy Grail; a minor source for Thomas Malory's Le Morte d'Arthur of 1485; published posthumously, England
 Clément Marot, Théodore de Bèze and Pierre Certon , an edition of the Geneva Psalter; Marot moved to Geneva, Switzerland this year and was commissioned by John Calvin to create rhymed versions of all the Psalms; Marot being unable to complete the work (he died in the fall of 1544), the effort was continued by Bèze; Switzerland, French-language

Births
Death years link to the corresponding "[year] in poetry" article:
 October – Sir Edward Dyer (died 1607), English courtier and poet
 October 23 – Juan de la Cueva (died c. 1610), Spanish poet and playwright
Also:
 Louis Bellaud (died 1588), French
 Sherefxan Bidlisi (died 1599), Iranian Kurdish historian, writer and poet
 Juan de la Cueva (died 1612), Spanish dramatist and poet
 Thomas Deloney (died 1600), English novelist and balladist
 Simon Goulart (died 1628) Swiss, French-language clergyman, writer and poet
 Sebastian Grabowiecki born about this year (died 1607), Polish
 Bartosz Paprocki (died 1614), Polish and Czech writer, historiographer, translator, and poet
 Siôn Phylip (died 1620), Welsh language poet
 Gosvāmī Tulsīdās, also spelled "Tulasī Dāsa" or "Tulsidas"; another source gives his birth year as 1532 (died 1623), Indian Hindu religious poet
 Antonio Veneziano (died 1593), Italian poet who wrote in the Sicilian language

Deaths
Birth years link to the corresponding "[year] in poetry" article:
 date not known – Sebastian Franck, who called himself "Franck von Word" died this year or in 1542 (born 1499), German freethinker, humanist, radical reformer and poet
 Marcello Palingenio Stellato, (born 1500), Italian, Latin-language poet

See also

 Poetry
 16th century in poetry
 16th century in literature
 French Renaissance literature
 Renaissance literature
 Spanish Renaissance literature

Notes

16th-century poetry
Poetry